Tracy Barrett is an American author of children’s books and young adult novels. She has published twenty-three books for young readers and one for adults.

Life 
Tracy Barrett was born in Cleveland, Ohio, but grew up just outside New York CIty, New York.

Notable Works
Barrett is best known for her historical young adult novel, Anna of Byzantium, a fictionalized retelling of the life of Princess Anna Comnena in medieval Byzantium.

Academic career
Besides an author, Barrett served as a senior lecturer of Italian language and civilization at Vanderbilt University from 1984 to 2012. She holds degrees from Brown and the University of California, Berkeley.

Bibliography

 Anna of Byzantium, Laurel Leaf, 1999
 The Trail of Tears: An American Tragedy, Perfection Learning Corporation, 2000
 Cold in Summer, Henry Holt and Co.,2003
 On Etruscan Time, Henry Holt and Co.,2005
 King of Ithaka, Henry Holt and Co., 2010
 Dark of the Moon, Houghton Mifflin Harcourt, 2011
 The Stepsister’s Tale, Harlequin Teen, 2014
 The Song of Orpheus, CreateSpace, 2016
 Marabel and the Book of Fate  (Little, 2018)
 Freefall Summer, Charlesbridge Teen, 2018

The Sherlock Files
 The 100-Year-Old Secret, Henry Holt and Co., 2008
 The Beast of Blackslope, Henry Holt and Co., 2009
 The Case that Time Forgot, Henry Holt and Co., 2010
 The Missing Heir, Henry Holt and Co., 2011

References

External links

 Publisher's Author Page*

Year of birth missing (living people)
Living people
American children's writers
Vanderbilt University faculty
Brown University alumni
University of California, Berkeley alumni